The Santa Catarina gubernatorial election will be held on 5 October 2014 to elect the next governor of the state of Santa Catarina.  If no candidate receives more than 50% of the vote, a second-round runoff election will be held on 26 October.  Governor Raimundo Colombo is running for a second term.

References

2014 Brazilian gubernatorial elections
Santa Catarina gubernatorial elections
October 2014 events in South America